Matías Nicolás Cano (born 20 April 1986) is an Argentine professional footballer who plays as a goalkeeper for Primera B side Cobreloa.

Honours

Club
UAI Urquiza
 Primera C Metropolitana (1): 2012–13

Coquimbo Unido 
 Primera B (2): 2018, 2021

References

External links
 
 
 Matías Cano at playmakerstats.com (English version of ceroacero.es)

1986 births
Living people
People from Adrogué
Sportspeople from Buenos Aires Province
Association football goalkeepers
Argentine footballers
Argentine expatriate footballers
Argentine expatriate sportspeople in Chile
Expatriate footballers in Chile
Club Atlético Temperley footballers
Huracán de Comodoro Rivadavia footballers
UAI Urquiza players
San Luis de Quillota footballers
Crucero del Norte footballers
Coquimbo Unido footballers
Cobreloa footballers
Primera C Metropolitana players
Primera B Metropolitana players
Chilean Primera División players
Torneo Federal A players
Primera B de Chile players